The 2013 Currie Cup Premier Division was the 75th season in the competition since it started in 1889 and was contested from 10 August to 26 October 2013. The tournament (known as the Absa Currie Cup Premier Division for sponsorship reasons) was the top tier of South Africa's premier domestic rugby union competition.

Competition

Regular season and title playoffs
There were 6 participating teams in the 2013 Currie Cup Premier Division. These teams played each other twice over the course of the season, once at home and once away.

Teams received four points for a win and two points for a draw. Bonus points were awarded to teams that score 4 or more tries in a game, as well as to teams losing a match by 7 points or less. Teams were ranked by log points.

The top 4 teams qualified for the title play-offs. In the semifinals, the team that finished first had home advantage against the team that finished fourth, while the team that finished second had home advantage against the team that finished third. The winners of these semi-finals played each other in the final, at the home venue of the higher-placed team.

Relegation playoffs
The bottom team on the log qualified for the promotion/relegation play-offs. That team played off against the team placed first in the 2013 Currie Cup First Division over two legs. The winner over these two ties (determined via team tables, with all Currie Cup ranking regulations in effect) qualified for the 2014 Currie Cup Premier Division, while the losing team qualified for the 2014 Currie Cup First Division.

Teams

Log

Final standings

Round-by-round

Fixtures and results
The following fixtures were released:

All times are South African (GMT+2).

Regular season

Round one

Round two

Round three

Round four

Round Five

Round Six

Round Seven

Round Eight

Round Nine

Round Ten

Title Play-Off Games

Semi-finals

Final

Promotion/relegation games

Log

Results

Players

Player Statistics
The following table contain only points which have been scored in competitive games in the 2013 Currie Cup Premier Division.

Awards

See also
 2013 Currie Cup First Division
 2013 Vodacom Cup
 2013 Under-21 Provincial Championship
 2013 Under-19 Provincial Championship

References

 
2013
2013 in South African rugby union
2013 rugby union tournaments for clubs